The Marinette Micropolitan Statistical Area, as defined by the United States Census Bureau, is an area consisting of two counties – one in Wisconsin and one in Michigan – anchored by the city of Marinette, Wisconsin. As of the 2000 census, the μSA had a population of 68,710 (though a July 1, 2009 estimate placed the population at 65,937).

Communities

Menominee County, Michigan
Carney
Cedar River
Cedarville Township
Daggett
Daggett Township
Faithorn Township
Gourley Township
Harris Township
Holmes Township
Ingallston Township
Lake Township
Mellen Township
Menominee
Menominee Township
Meyer Township
Nadeau Township
Spalding Township
Stephenson
Stephenson Township
Wallace, Michigan

Marinette County, Wisconsin
Amberg, Wisconsin
Town of Amberg
Town of Athelstane
Town of Beaver
Town of Beecher
Coleman
Crivitz
Town of Dunbar
Town of Goodman
Town of Grover
Town of Lake
Marinette, Wisconsin (Principal city)
Town of Middle Inlet
Niagara, Wisconsin
Town of Niagara
Town of Pembine
Peshtigo
Town of Peshtigo
Town of Porterfield
Pound
Town of Pound
Powers
Town of Silver Cliff
Town of Stephenson
Town of Wagner
Wausaukee
Town of Wausaukee

View at night

Demographics
As of the census of 2000, there were 68,710 people, 28,114 households, and 18,835 families residing within the USA. The racial makeup of the area was 97.40% White, 0.18% African American, 1.15% Native American, 0.25% Asian, 0.01% Pacific Islander, 0.20% from other races, and 0.80% from two or more races. Hispanic or Latino of any race were 0.75% of the population.

The median income for a household in the USA was $34,072, and the median income for a family was $41,312. Males had a median income of $32,170 versus $21,638 for females. The per capita income for the USA was $17,201.

See also
Wisconsin census statistical areas
Michigan census statistical areas

References

 
Geography of Marinette County, Wisconsin
Geography of Menominee County, Michigan